Kim Wassell (born 9 June 1957) is an English former footballer. He played for several clubs in the Football League Third and Fourth Divisions as well as in Australia and Finland. Wassell capped once for HJK Helsinki in the Finnish premier division Veikkausliiga.

In 2002 Wassell was charged of murdering his ex-girlfriend but was found not guilty.

References 

1957 births
Living people
footballers from Wolverhampton
English footballers
English Football League players
Northampton Town F.C. players
Hull City A.F.C. players
Swansea City A.F.C. players
Wolverhampton Wanderers F.C. players
Gresley F.C. players
Shrewsbury Town F.C. players
Veikkausliiga players
Vaasan Palloseura players
Helsingin Jalkapalloklubi players
English expatriate footballers
Expatriate footballers in Finland
People acquitted of murder
IF Gnistan players
Association football defenders
Bollklubben-46 players